Airwolf is the helicopter from the 1980s American television series of the same name. Its fictional features included stratospheric ceiling, stealth noise signature, a wide range of weapons and supersonic speed. The Airwolf helicopter was a conventional Bell 222 helicopter modified by attaching some film props.

Bell 222 example

The flying Airwolf was derived from a Bell 222, a twin-turboshaft helicopter produced for the civilian market and typically employed for corporate, emergency medical or utility transport missions, with seating for up to 10, including the pilot.

The airframe used for Airwolf was serial number 47085 (registration number N3176S), of the initial production version, sometimes unofficially called a Bell 222A. During filming of the series the helicopter was owned by JetCopters Inc. in Van Nuys, California.

After the show was canceled, the modifications were removed from the aircraft and are now owned by a private collector. The helicopter was repainted and eventually sold to the German helicopter charter company, Hubschrauber-Sonder-Dienst (aka HSD Luftrettung and Blue Helicopter Alliance), and given the registration number D-HHSD. While operating as an air ambulance, the helicopter crashed into a mountain in thunderstorm on June 6, 1992, killing all three occupants onboard.

A new, full-size replica of the Airwolf helicopter was created by Steven W. Stull for display in the short-lived Helicopter Headquarters museum in Pigeon Forge, Tennessee that opened in August 2006, using a non-flying Bell 222 with molds taken directly from the originals used in the show. The museum was unsuccessful, and offered the replica for sale through eBay. The replica was housed between 2007 and 2015 in the Tennessee Museum of Aviation in Sevierville, Tennessee. It was then sold to a private collector in California, having been further modified at West Coast Customs during September 2015. The replica was then placed on top of an expensive mansion in Bel Air, California.

The Airwolf helicopter

Airwolf was painted "Phantom Gray Metallic" (DuPont Imron 5031X) on top, and a custom pearl-gray (almost white) on the bottom, in a countershaded pattern. The craft was also fitted with various prop modifications, such as "turbojet" engines and intakes, an in-air refueling nozzle and blister cowling on the nose, retractable machine guns at the wingtips, and a retractable rocket launcher, known as the "ADF Pod" (ADF standing for All Directional Firing, as the pod could rotate 180 degrees to fire at targets at the sides—90 degrees to the left, forward, or 90 degrees to the right) on its belly.

The look of the modifications was designed by Andrew Probert, and they were first applied to the non-flying mock-up (built from the body of the very first Bell 222, serial number 47001). From this mock-up molds were made so that parts could be made to FAA specifications before they were added to the flying helicopter. After the maiden flight with the modifications, primary pilot David Jones told the producer that "It flies better now than before!"

The machine guns mounted on the side of the landing gear sponsons were mock-ups that used spark plugs and fuel to simulate gun firing. Other modifications were implied with Foley and sets; the interior sets were of a fantastical high-tech nature, and there were implied "stealth" noise-reducing capabilities with creative use of sound effects. On the show, the deployment of the weapons systems were usually shown via close-ups of the action; in reality, these close-ups were produced on props off-site, while the non-moving prop components were attached to the aircraft by a technician in the field or at the JetCopters hangar.

The concept behind Airwolf was a super-fast and armed helicopter that could "blend in" by appearing to be civilian and non-military in origin, a "wolf in sheep's clothing". Airwolf's insignia patch (also designed by Probert) as worn by the flight-crew was a snarling wolf's head with gossamer wings that appears to be wearing a sheepskin complete with the head of a lamb over the wolf's forehead. Airwolf is sometimes referred to in-show as "The Lady" by Santini and Hawke.

In the show, Airwolf was an armored, stealthy aircraft. It could perform impossible maneuvers and stunts, including traveling at Mach speeds (the theoretical maximum speed of a helicopter is significantly below Mach 0.5, or half the speed of sound), and flying into the stratosphere. Some of these impossible capabilities are explained in the show by such features as auxiliary jet engines (visible at the roots of the landing gear sponsons), rotor blades that can be disengaged for supersonic flight and a lifting body fuselage.

Sound effects were also associated with many of the aircraft's abilities. When Airwolf bolted across the sky in "turbo boost" mode, one would hear it "howl like a wolf" as it made a glass-shattering sound effect. When sitting idle, the aircraft made a mechanical trilling sound, and while hovering the rotor blades made a ghostly wind drone.

The weapons were state-of-the-art, with machine guns that could rip apart tanks and bunkers. The belly missile pod could fire a variety of rockets, including air-to-surface Mavericks, Hellfires, and heat-seeking air-to-air Sidewinders. When fired, these rockets usually glowed like a laser bolt or "photon torpedo" from Star Trek. Airwolf was also equipped with an advanced computer system which could identify and track aircraft and ground vehicles. It could display 3D wireframe models and schematics of its targets. The communications system could eavesdrop on radio and telephone conversations, tap into and foul up computer systems, jam enemy transmission frequencies and disrupt ground-based electrical systems. The stealth systems were capable of rendering Airwolf invisible to radar, as well as producing multiple radar returns. The weapons system could be tied in with the communications system to lock the missiles onto any monitored electronic system. In the first episode, a Bullpup missile was launched from Airwolf against an American destroyer while the helicopter was being used by its in-story inventor, Doctor Charles Henry Moffet.

In the 2nd episode of Season 3 ("Airwolf II"), Airwolf had a twin, Airwolf II, also known as Redwolf. Redwolf was secretly built by The Firm to replace Airwolf, but was subsequently stolen and flown by Harlan Jenkins, its egotistical creator and test-pilot rival of Stringfellow Hawke. Redwolf differed from Airwolf in that its underbelly was painted red (where Airwolf was painted pearl-grey). It was also equipped with a powerful laser weapon coupled with a quick-firing, single-tube rocket pod (although in reality it had no external modifications to the Bell 222). Season 4 also featured a similar copter to Redwolf, known as the Scorpion, though the footage of the dogfighting was recycled from the "Airwolf II" episode.

Specifications

Models

Static-display models

Over the years a number of licensed Airwolf models have been available.

 Ertl 5″ (~1:100 scale) die-cast toy model (1984) – available carded (alone) and boxed (with a Santini Air helicopter and jeep)
 Ertl 14″ (~1:36 scale) die-cast toy model (1984) – available boxed
 AMT/Ertl 1:48 scale plastic model kit (1984) – many Asian knock-offs are also available
 Charawheels (Hot Wheels in Japan) 94 mm (1:160) scale die-cast toy model (2004)
 Aoshima 1:48 scale die-cast collector's model (2005–2007) – available in cobalt blue ("normal"), black ("Limited"), weathered (2006), and matte black (2007)
 Aoshima 1:48 scale plastic kit (2009) – superior in moulding and detail to earlier ERTL/AMT models.

Flyable models
 Airwolf 1:19 scale Fuselage kit (unknown) – designed to fit the T-Rex RC helicopter
 Cox gas-engined Airwolf (1988). Non-RC. Engine powered a small rotor which lifted the model up; a larger free-wheeling rotor auto-rotated the model down when the fuel ran out. Location of touchdown at the mercy of prevailing winds.
 Different fuselage kits by German RC helicopters manufacturer Vario with optional functional retractable machine guns (firing blanks).

See also

 Blue Thunder (helicopter)

References

External links
 Airwolf Themes—reator of soundtrack, builder of the full-size Airwolf museum replica, and replica helmets.

Fictional helicopters
Airwolf